Robert Glen (born 16 January 1875) was a Scottish footballer, who played for Renton, Sheffield Wednesday, Rangers, Hibernian and Scotland.

References

Sources

External links

London Hearts profile
FitbaStats.com profile

1875 births
Year of death missing
Scottish footballers
Scotland international footballers
Association football defenders
Scottish Football League players
Scottish Football League representative players
Renton F.C. players
Sheffield Wednesday F.C. players
Rangers F.C. players
Hibernian F.C. players
Place of death missing